Agni Kshethram is a 1980 Indian Malayalam film,  directed by P. T. Rajan. The film stars Prem Nazir, Srividya, Roja Ramani and Jagathy Sreekumar in the lead roles. The film has musical score by K. J. Joy.

Cast
Prem Nazir as Dr. Suresh
Srividya as Sreedevi
Roja Ramani as Radha
Jagathy Sreekumar Mandan Thoma
Jose Prakash as Vishwanathan
Kumarji Ponnadu
Kainakari Thangaraj
Kanakadurga as Nurse Shantha
Ramadevi as Subhashini
Thrissur Elsy as Nazir's & Shobhana's Mother
 Shobhana
 Babichan
 Kottayam Valsalan
 Raju
 Sree vijaya]
 Leela
 Valsala

Soundtrack
The music was composed by K. .J Joy and the lyrics were written by Madhu Alappuzha.

References

External links
 

1980 films
1980s Malayalam-language films